ROG Phone 5 is a line of Android gaming smartphones made by Asus as the fourth generation of ROG smartphone series following the third generation ROG Phone 3 (and skipping the number four as the number four is considered unlucky in many East Asian cultures). It was launched on 10 March 2021.

Models 
The lineup includes three models— the ROG Phone 5 is the base model which costs €799. The ROG Phone 5 Pro is a slightly higher-end model with similar specifications, and the ROG Phone 5 Ultimate is their highest-end and most expensive model at €1299.

ROG Phone 5s 
Asus announced the ROG Phone 5s and 5s Pro in August 2021 as hardware revisions. Both phones have the Snapdragon 888+ chipset, as well as a faster touch sampling rate of 360Hz compared to 300Hz on the ROG Phone 5.

References

External links 
 ROG Phone 5
 ROG Phone 5 Ultimate
 ROG Phone 5s
 ROG Phone 5s Pro

Mobile phones introduced in 2021
Android (operating system) devices
Asus smartphones
Mobile phones with multiple rear cameras
Mobile phones with 8K video recording
Dual screen phone